Lepetelloidea is a superfamily of sea snails, small deepwater limpets, marine gastropod mollusks in the clade Vetigastropoda (according to the taxonomy of the Gastropoda by Bouchet & Rocroi, 2005). (Previously this superfamily was in the order Cocculiniformia.)

Description
Species in this superfamily have undivided shell muscles  (except Lepetellidae). They possess secondary gill leaflets or their gills are reduced. Their radula contains a well-developed rachidian tooth.

The soft body lacks subpallial (i.e. below the mantle) glands. They have paired kidneys with the right one larger. With the exception of the subfamily Choristellinae, all known lepetelloids are simultaneous hermaphrodites, meaning they possess both male and female reproductive organs at the same time. Species in the subfamily Choristellinae  are  gonochoristic, i.e. with distinct males and females). The ciliated gonoducts (the ducts through which the gametes reach the exterior) contain no glands.

Families
Families within the superfamily Lepetelloidea include:
 Addisoniidae
 Bathyphytophilidae
 Caymanabyssiidae
 Cocculinellidae     
 Lepetellidae Dall, 1881
 Choristellinae - in the taxonomy of the Gastropoda according to Bouchet & Rocroi, 2005, the group of species previously known as the family Choristellidae was reranked  as Choristellinae, a subfamily of Lepetellidae.  
 Osteopeltidae
 Pseudococculinidae
 Pyropeltidae

References

 Haszprunar G  &  McLean  JH  1996.  Anatomy and systematics of bathyphytophilid limpets  (Mollusca,  Archeogastropoda) from the northeastern  Pacific. Zool.  Scripta 25: 35–49.

External links

 
Vetigastropoda